Ragay station is a railway station located on the South Main Line in Camarines Sur, Philippines. It is still in use for the Bicol Express and Isarog Limited.

History
Ragay was opened on August 28, 1933, as part of the expansion of the Legazpi Division line to Port Ragay. Through services to and from Manila commenced on January 31, 1938.

References

Philippine National Railways stations
Railway stations in Camarines Sur